Newbie, newb, noob, noobie, n00b or nub is a slang term for a novice or newcomer, or somebody inexperienced in a profession or activity. Contemporary use can particularly refer to a beginner or new user of computers, often concerning Internet activity, such as online gaming or Linux use.

The origin of this term is uncertain. Earliest uses probably date to late twentieth century United States Armed Forces jargon, though possible precursor terms are much earlier. Variant forms of the noun include newby and newbie, while the related term noob (often stylized as "n00b") is often used in online gaming.

History
Etymology of the term is uncertain. It may derive from "newie", which is attested in U.S. and Australian sources of the 1850s, meaning a neophyte in a place or situation; alternatively, it may derive from the British public school slang "new boy" or "new blood", which is attributed to the same era and was applied to a schoolboy in his first term.

In the 1960s and 1970s, the term "newbie" had a limited usage among U.S. troops in the Vietnam War as a slang term for a new man in a unit.

Another use of the term newbee was the moniker given to new U.S. Navy recruit students attending Basic Electricity and Electronics school by more senior students, a requisite course prior to enrollment in the A-school course at Naval Air Technical Training Center, Millington, Tennessee.

Its earliest known usage on an internet may have been on the Usenet newsgroup talk.bizarre. The term is believed to have entered online usage by 1981.

Coming from an oral tradition, the term has various spellings. Among alternative forms are "newby", "nubie", and "newbee" (e.g. Los Angeles Times of August 1985: "It had to do with newbees. I could be wrong on the spelling, but newbies are the rookies among the Blue Angels.").

In 2000, Electronic Arts released The Sims. The game featured a tutorial house with a family called The Newbies.

In 2009, "noob" was among candidates for the one-millionth English word selection by the Global Language Monitor.

Connotations of variants
Different spellings can have quite different connotations; so in some contexts a "newb" refers to a beginner who is willing to learn, while a "noob" refers disparagingly to an inexperienced or under-talented hacker or gamer who lacks the determination to learn.

Similar terms in other languages
 In Korean, the equivalent term is chobo or hasu, the opposite of gosu, meaning "highly skilled".
 In Chinese, cainiao. It either originated from Hong Kong or from the Taiwanese army. It became an Internet slang term used in the Chinese-speaking community.

See also

 FNG, another term for someone new to a unit used in the Vietnam War
 Luser, a pejorative term for inexperienced computer users

Notes

References

External links

 Merriam Webster on Newbie

Beginners and newcomers
Internet slang
MUD terminology
Video game culture